San Juanito may refer to:
 San Juanito, Meta, Colombia
 San Juanito de Escobedo, Mexico
 San Juanito, Chihuahua, a town in Bocoyna Municipality, Chihuahua, Mexico
 San Juanito (music genre), a genre in Andean music

See also 
 Juanito, a given name
 San Juan (disambiguation)